Arman Ghasemi is an Iranian football defender, who currently plays and captains for Paykan in Persian Gulf Pro League.

Career
Ghasemi joined Gahar Zagros in summer 2012.

Club Career Statistics
Last Update:  7 August 2014

References

External links
Arman Ghasemi at PersianLeague.com

Iranian footballers
Association football defenders
Paykan F.C. players
Rah Ahan players
Gahar Zagros players
Naft Masjed Soleyman F.C. players
Sportspeople from Tehran
1989 births
Living people